Shock is the eighth studio album by American rock band Tesla.  Produced and co-written by Phil Collen, the work was released on 8 March 2019 via UMe. and recorded at J Street Recorders.

Background 
In January 2019, the ensemble released the title track for the album.  The following month, the group published "California Summer Song".

Critical reception 
Robert Rheubottom of AXS stated that "The song 'Shock' opens with an insistent retro-80s sounding backbeat, supplied by drummer Troy Luccketta. Bassist Brian Wheat and guitarist Frank Hannon climb aboard to set up the ominous groove for the song's first verse as lead vocalist Jeff Keith sings, “Clock is ticking I feel it/Ain't no stopping it now.”"

Lauryn Schaffner of Loudwire said that ""Taste Like" is a cheerful, gritty rock song that stays true to the band's bluesy, '70s-inspired roots".

Track listing

Personnel
Band
 Jeff Keith - lead vocals
 Frank Hannon - guitars, vocals, piano, bass
 Brian Wheat - bass, vocals, piano
 Troy Luccketta - drums, percussion
 Dave Rude - guitars, vocals, bass

Charts

References 

Tesla (band) albums
2019 albums